Jean II Restout (26 March 1692 – 1 January 1768) was a French painter, whose late baroque classicism rendered his altarpieces, such as the Death of Saint Scholastica an "isolated achievement" that ran counter to his rococo contemporaries.

Biography
Jean Restout was born in Rouen, the son of Jean I Restout and Marie M. Jouvenet, sister and pupil of the then well-known painter Jean Jouvenet.

In 1717, the Académie Royale de Peinture et de Sculpture having elected him a member on his work for the Prix de Rome, he remained in Paris, instead of proceeding to Italy, exhibited at all the salons, and filled successively every post of academical distinction. His works, chiefly altar-pieces (Louvre Museum), ceilings and designs for Gobelin tapestries, were engraved by Charles-Nicolas Cochin, Drevet and others.

His son, Jean-Bernard Restout (1732–1797), won the Prix de Rome in 1758, and on his return from Italy was received into the Academy; but his refusal to comply with rules led to a quarrel with that body. Roland appointed him keeper of the Garde Meuble, but this piece of favor nearly cost him his life during the Terror.

Gallery

References

18th-century French painters
French male painters
1692 births
1768 deaths
Artists from Rouen
18th-century French male artists